Maly Shantar Island ( Ostrov Maly Shantar) is a small, narrow island in the northwestern Sea of Okhotsk, one of the Shantar Islands.

Geography
Maly Shantar or Little Shantar Island is about 19 km (11.8 mi) long with a maximum width of 6 km (3.7 mi). It is separated from Bolshoy Shantar or Big Shantar Island to the north by Severo-Vostochnyy Strait, from Belichy Island to the east by Opasny Strait, and from the mainland to the south by Lindholm Strait. To its west lies the Shantar Sea.

History

Between 1853 and 1889, American whaleships anchored off Malyy Shantar to obtain shelter from storms or send out whaleboats to hunt bowhead whales in nearby Proliv Lindgol'ma (which they called The Gut), Tugur Bay, or Ulban Bay. Their main anchorage was Long's Harbor (Abrek Bay) to the southeast of the island. They also went ashore to obtain wood.

References

Shantar Islands
Islands of the Sea of Okhotsk
Islands of the Russian Far East
Islands of Khabarovsk Krai